Patrick Thomas Cormack, Baron Cormack,  (born 18 May 1939) is a British politician, historian, journalist and author. He served as a Member of Parliament (MP) for 40 years, from 1970 to 2010. Cormack is a member of the Conservative Party and is seen as a one-nation conservative.

Before entering Parliament, Cormack was a teacher. He was elected for Cannock at the 1970 general election. Following boundary changes he was elected for South West Staffordshire in 1974, renamed South Staffordshire in 1983. He was elected chair of the Northern Ireland Affairs Select Committee in 2005. Since standing down from the House of Commons in 2010, he has served as an active life peer in the House of Lords.

Early life and career
Cormack was born to Thomas Charles and Kathleen Mary Cormack in Grimsby just before the outbreak of World War II. He was educated locally at the St James's Choir School and the Havelock School, before attending the University of Hull, where he received a Bachelor of Arts degree in 1961.

He was a teacher at his former school, St James's Choir School, in 1961. Cormack contested the safe Labour parliamentary seat of Bolsover at the 1964 general election, where he lost to the sitting MP Harold Neal, who won with a majority of 23,103 votes.  At the 1966 general election, Cormack contested his hometown seat of Grimsby, but again was defeated, this time by the secretary of state for education and science, Anthony Crosland, who had a majority of 8,126. Cormack became a training and education officer with Ross Ltd in 1966. In 1967, he was appointed an assistant house master at the Wrekin College in Wellington, Shropshire for two years, after which he became the head of history at Brewood Grammar School in 1969.

Prior to 1970, Cormack was a member of the Bow Group and the Conservative Monday Club, resigning from both at the end of 1971.

Parliamentary career
At the 1970 general election, Cormack stood for the seat of Cannock, and this time was elected, narrowly defeating the incumbent Labour MP Jennie Lee. Cormack won with a majority of 1,529.

From 1970 to 1973, Cormack served as a parliamentary private secretary to the Department of Health and Social Security. He moved constituencies at the February 1974 general election, leaving the marginal seat of Cannock and instead contesting the adjacent newly drawn seat of South West Staffordshire, which he won comfortably with a majority of 9,758.

Cormack became chairman of the editorial board of The House magazine in 1976, and editor of the magazine in 1979.

Cormack was a member of the Education Select Committee for the duration of the 1979 parliament.

On 7 October 1981, with national unemployment approaching 3,000,000 (compared to 1,500,000 two years previously), Cormack urged Prime Minister Margaret Thatcher to change her economic policies, namely monetarism, to tackle inflation, if Britain was to avoid economic disaster.

In 1983, his constituency changed its name to its present one, South Staffordshire, and after the 1983 general election, In 1997, after 27 years as an MP on the backbenches, he was promoted by the then leader of the Opposition, William Hague, to become the opposition's Deputy Leader of the House of Commons.

He resigned from this position in 2000 in order to stand for the position of Speaker of the House of Commons (following the retirement of Betty Boothroyd). However, he was unsuccessful in his bid for the speakership, with the House instead choosing Labour MP Michael Martin for the role. During the 2005–10 parliament, Cormack was the chairman of the Northern Ireland Affairs Select Committee.

Cormack became life president of The House magazine in 2005.

The vote in South Staffordshire was postponed at the 2005 general election due to the death of the Liberal Democrat candidate Jo Harrison. When the election did take place on 23 June 2005, Cormack won comfortably. In February 2007, it was announced that Cormack had failed to win the re-adoption of his constituency party for the next general election. This vote was later declared invalid as the number of votes recorded exceeded the number of people present at the meeting. In July 2007, the South Staffordshire Conservatives' executive council voted on the matter, but it resulted in a tie. Consequently, a vote of all local party members was held to decide whether Cormack should remain the party's candidate at the next general election. In the vote, held on 14 September, Cormack was readopted as the Conservative candidate, receiving the backing of over 75% of participating party members. Cormack expressed his gratitude and called the victory a "great relief". Subsequently, on 1 December 2009, Cormack announced his intention to stand down at the 2010 general election.

Cormack was created a life peer on 18 December 2010, as Baron Cormack, of Enville in the County of Staffordshire. He sits on the Conservative benches in the House of Lords. Cormack opposed the Coalition's plans to reform the House of Lords, speaking out against them numerous times in the chamber.

Cormack is seen as a One Nation Tory. He was a Heathite, and was a frequent rebel under Margaret Thatcher – one of the so-called "wets".

Other interests
Cormack takes an active interest in historical issues, particularly those related to English Heritage. He is also a knowledgeable Parliamentary historian. He has written many books on subjects ranging from the history of Parliament, British castles, English cathedrals, and a book on William Wilberforce.

Cormack has been a trustee of the Churches Preservation Trust since 1972. He has been a council member of British Archaeology since 1979, and is also a Liveryman of the Worshipful Company of Glaziers and Painters of Glass for the same length of time. From 1983 to 1993, he was Trustee on the Winston Churchill Memorial Trust. He is a consultant and adviser to FIRST, an international affairs organisation, since 1985. He is a vice-president of the Royal Stuart Society and the Heritage Crafts Association.

A committed Christian, Cormack was a rector's warden at Parliament's parish church, St Margaret's, Westminster, from 1978 to 1990.

Personal life
Cormack married Kathleen Mary MacDonald in 1967. They have two sons. He lists his recreations in Who's Who as "fighting philistines, walking, visiting old churches, avoiding sitting on fences". He is a member of the Athenaeum and Lincolnshire clubs.

Honours

 He was elected as a Fellow of the Society of Antiquaries of London (FSA) on 5 May 1978.
 He was made a Knight Bachelor in the 1995 New Years Honours List, for his service to Parliament.
 He became a Freeman of the City of London in 1980. 
 He was elected as a Fellow of the Royal Historical Society (FRHistS) in 2010. 
 He was elected as an Honorary Fellow of the Historical Association (FHA) in 2010.
 He was awarded the Honorary degree of Doctor of Letters (D.Litt.) by the University of Hull in 2010. 
 He was appointed a Deputy Lieutenant (DL) for the County of Staffordshire on 11 April 2011.
 He was awarded the Honorary degree of Doctor of Laws (LL.D) by the Catholic University of America on 21 June 2013.
 He was awarded the Freedom of the City of Lincoln on 18 March 2022.

Arms

References

External links
ePolitix – Sir Patrick Cormack FSA official site
Guardian Unlimited Politics – Ask Aristotle: Patrick Cormack MP
TheyWorkForYou.com – Patrick Cormack MP
 
The Guardian – Election begins in the seat time forgot 2 June 2005

|-

1939 births
Living people
Conservative Party (UK) life peers
Conservative Party (UK) MPs for English constituencies
UK MPs 1970–1974
UK MPs 1974
UK MPs 1974–1979
UK MPs 1979–1983
UK MPs 1983–1987
UK MPs 1987–1992
UK MPs 1992–1997
UK MPs 1997–2001
UK MPs 2001–2005
UK MPs 2005–2010
People from Grimsby
Deputy Lieutenants of Staffordshire
Fellows of the Society of Antiquaries of London
Fellows of the Royal Historical Society
Knights Bachelor
Politicians awarded knighthoods
Life peers created by Elizabeth II